Vyatkino is a rural locality (a settlement) and the administrative center of Vyatkinskoye Rural Settlement, Sudogodsky District, Vladimir Oblast, Russia. The population was 1,338 as of 2010. There are 20 streets.

Geography 
Vyatkino is located 34 km northwest of Sudogda (the district's administrative centre) by road. Pogrebishchi is the nearest rural locality.

References 

Rural localities in Sudogodsky District